The Sankt Laurentii Church Mama Tower is all that remains of Sankt Laurentii Church in Roskilde on the Danish island of Zealand. The church itself was built of travertine in the Romanesque style in the 13th century but was torn down after the Reformation leaving only the tower from the beginning of the 16th century. The tower now forms part of the former town hall. It contains a museum where archaeological finds from 1998 can be seen.

See also
 Listed buildings in Roskilde Municipality
 List of churches in Roskilde Municipality

References

Churches in Roskilde Municipality
Gothic architecture in Denmark
Towers completed in the 16th century
Listed buildings and structures in Roskilde Municipality
Tourist attractions in Region Zealand
Museums in Region Zealand
Churches in the Diocese of Roskilde